Dewey is an extinct town in Polk County, in the U.S. state of Missouri.

A post office called Dewey was established in 1898, and remained in operation until 1906. The community has the name of George Dewey, an officer in the Spanish–American War.

References

Ghost towns in Missouri
Former populated places in Polk County, Missouri